The Erfurt Formation, also known as the Lower Keuper (German: Untere Keuper, Lettenkeuper, Lettenkohle or Lettenkohlenkeuper), is a stratigraphic formation of the Keuper group and the Germanic Trias supergroup. It was deposited during the Ladinian stage of the Triassic period. It lies above the Upper Muschelkalk and below the Middle Keuper.

Definition 
The formation was defined in Erfurt-Melchendorf in 1830 by Franz Xaver Hofmann and named for the nearby town of Erfurt.

The Erfurt Formation is underlain by the Upper Muschelkalk. The lower boundary to the Erfurt Formation is the "Lettenkohlensandstein" in northern Germany and the "Grenz-bone-beds" in southern Germany.

The formation is a sequence of dolomite, lacustrine limestones, claystone, evaporites, and fluviatile sandstones. The color is usually grey but can also be brown or reddish brown. The average thickness is 60 to 80 meter, with a maximum thickness of 700 meter in the Glückstadt-Graben.

The upper boundary is marked by dolomites, or claystones of the Grabfeld Formation.

Fossil content 

The Erfurt Formation is known for its vertebrate fossils. Different kinds of fish, amphibians and archosauriforms have been found. Usually they are found as bone beds, but in 1977 the first complete skeletons were found near Kupferzell. They include Mastodonsaurus, Gerrothorax, Plagiosuchus, Callistomordax, Nanogomphodon, Batrachotomus, Kupferzellia and Palaeoxyris friessi.

Reptiles

Synapsids

Amphibians

Bony fish

Cartilaginous fish

References 

Geologic formations of Germany
Triassic System of Europe
Triassic Germany
Ladinian Stage
Marl formations
Dolomite formations
Limestone formations
Shale formations
Sandstone formations
Shallow marine deposits
Ooliferous formations
Fossiliferous stratigraphic units of Europe
Paleontology in Germany
Formations
Formations